Events from the year 1582 in art.

Events
The Book of Felicity is produced in the Ottoman Empire, for Sultan Murad III.

Paintings

Federico Barocci - Entombment (Santa Croce, Senigallia)
Robert Peake - Portrait of Anne Knollys
El Greco
The Martyrdrom of Saint Maurice
Saint Peter in Tears
Maso da San Friano - Christ Reborn
Cherubino Alberti
The Presentation at the Temple
The Resurrection
The Holy Family 
Lucas van Valckenborch – Mountainous Landscape

Births
January 26 – Giovanni Lanfranco, Italian painter of the Baroque period (died 1647) 
August - Bartolomeo Manfredi, Italian painter, a leading member of the Caravaggisti (died 1622)
November 18 - Caspar de Crayer, Flemish painter (died 1669)
date unknown
Wouter Abts, Flemish painter of conversation pieces and landscapes (died 1642/3)
Remigio Cantagallina, Italian etcher, active in the Baroque period (died 1656)
Francis Cleyn, German painter and tapestry designer (died 1658)
Jacob Franquart, Flemish painter, court architect and copper plate engraver (died 1651)
Lawrence Hilliard, English miniature painter (died 1648)
Vespasiano Strada, Italian painter and engraver of the early-Baroque period (died 1622)
Richard Tassel,  French painter (died 1660)
David Teniers the Elder, Flemish painter (died 1649)
probable
Frans Hals, Dutch Golden Age painter (died 1666)

Deaths
December 15 - Giorgio Ghisi, Italian coppersmith, painter, and engraver  (born 1512/1520)
date unknown
Leonardo Brescia, Italian painter (born 1481)
Francesco da Urbino, Italian painter (born 1545)

 
Years of the 16th century in art